The 2007 Tour de Langkawi was the 12th edition of the Tour de Langkawi, a cycling stage race that took place in Malaysia. It started on 2 February in Langkawi and ended on 11 February in Kuala Lumpur. This race was rated by the Union Cycliste Internationale (UCI) as a 2.HC (hors category) race on the 2006–07 UCI Asia Tour calendar.

Anthony Charteau, the French cyclist emerged as the winner of the race, followed by two Colombian cyclists; José Serpa second and Walter Pedraza third. Alberto Loddo of Italy won the points classification category and Walter Pedraza won the mountains classification category.  won the team classification category.

Stages
The cyclists competed in 10 stages, covering a distance of 1,352.2 kilometres. Stage 3 and Stage 8 were mountain type stage.

Classification leadership

Final standings

General classification

Points classification

Mountains classification

Asian rider classification

Team classification

Asian team classification

Stage results

Stage 1
2 February 2007 — Langkawi,

Stage 2
3 February 2007 — Kangar to Kulim,

Stage 3
4 February 2007 — Kuala Kangsar to Cameron Highlands,

Stage 4
5 February 2007 — Gua Musang to Kota Bharu,

Stage 5
6 February 2007 — Kota Bharu to Kuala Terengganu,

Stage 6
7 February 2007 — Kuala Terengganu to Chukai,

Stage 7
8 February 2007 — Kuantan to Karak,

Stage 8
9 February 2007 — Shah Alam to Genting Highlands,

Stage 9
10 February 2007 — Putrajaya to Seremban,

Stage 10
11 February 2007 — Kuala Lumpur, Criterium

List of teams and riders
A total of 23 teams were invited to participate in the 2007 Tour de Langkawi. Out of the 136 riders, a total of 102 riders made it to the finish in Kuala Lumpur.

 
  Thomas Voeckler
  Pierre Drancourt
  Yoann Le Boulanger
  Laurent Lefèvre
  Franck Rénier
  Didier Rous
 
  Francesco Bellotti
  László Bodrogi
  William Bonnet
  Anthony Charteau
  Julian Dean
  Benoît Poilvet
 
  Sandy Casar
  Timothy Gudsell
  Lilian Jégou
  Johan Lindgren
  Ian McLeod
  Fabien Patanchon
 
  Sylvain Calzati
  José Luis Arrieta
  Philip Deignan
  Julien Loubet
  David Navas
  Blaise Sonnery
 
  Alexander Khatuntsev
  Sergey Kolesnikov
  Erwin Thijs
  Luis Pasamontes
  José Rujano
  Stijn Vandenbergh
 
  Julio Alberto Pérez
  Guillermo Bongiorno
  Maximiliano Richeze
  Sergiy Matveyev
  Francesco Tomei
  Filippo Savini

 
  Nikolay Trusov
  Sergey Klimov
  Pavel Brutt
  Steffen Weigold
  Elio Aggiano
  Salvatore Commesso
 
  Wladimir Belli
  Alberto Loddo
  Anthony Brea
  José Serpa
  Walter Pedraza
  Fabio Duarte
 
  Huub Duyn
  Kilian Patour
  Brad Huff
  Michael Creed
  Timmy Duggan
  Michael Lange
 Vitória ASC
  Paulo Barroso
  Jose Rodrigues
  Pedro Costa
  Micael Isidoro
  Gilberto Sampaio
  Ng Yong Li
 South Africa
  Daryl Impey
  Johannes Jacobus Kachelhoffer
  Rupert Rheeder
  David George
  Nicholas White
  Tiaan Kannemeyer
 
  Yukihiro Doi
  Tomoya Kano
  Hidenori Nodera
  Yoshiyuki Abe
  Yoshimasa Hirose
  Masahiro Shinagawa

 SouthAustralia.com
  Gene Bates
  Nicholas Sanderson
  Jonathan Clarke
  Wesley Sulzberger
  William Ford
  Shaun Higgerson
 
  Lai Kuan Hua
  Paul Griffin
  Ching Chon Te
  Jai Crawford
  Ghader Mizbani
  Hossein Askari
 Nippo-Meitan Hompo
  Yukiya Arashiro
  Koji Fukushima
  Shinichi Fukushima
  Takashi Miyazawa
  Miyataka Shimizu
  Mariusz Wiesiak
 
  Jamsran Ulzii-Orshikh
  Sergey Kudentsov
  Thijs Zonneveld
  Xing Yandong
  Pol Nabben
  Loh Sea Keong
 Hong Kong Pro Cycling
  Wong Kam-po
  Cheung King Wai
  Lam Kai Tsun
  Tang Wang Yip
  Chan Chun Hing
  Wu Kin San
 Polygon Sweet Nice
  Yevgeniv Yakovlev
  Vyacheslav Dyadichkin
  Hari Fitrianto
  Budi Santoso
  Herwin Jaya
  Artemiy Timofeev

 
  Amir Zargari
  Abbas Saeidi Tanha
  Moezeddin Seyed-Rezaei
  Mostafa Seyed-Rezaei
  Sirous Hashemzadeh
  Mehdi Faridi
 South Korea
  Oh Se-Yong
  Chung Jeong-Seok
  Park Sung-Baek
  Lee Won-Jae
  You Ki-Hong
  Lee San-Jin
 Malaysia
  Suhardi Hassan
  Mohd Rauf Nur Misbah
  Safwan Sawai
  Fallanie Ali
  Muhammad Fauzan Ahmad Lutfi
  Mohd Sayuti Mohd Zahit
 
  Anuar Manan
  Ahmad Haidar Anuawar
  Mohd Nur Rizuan Zainal
  Mohd Nor Umardi Rosdi
  Tonton Susanto
  Amin Saryana
 MNCF Development
  Amir Rusli
  Mohd Jasmin Ruslan
  Saiful Anuar Abd. Aziz
  Mohd Faris Abd. Razak
  Mohamed Harrif Salleh
  Mohamed Zamri Salleh

References

Tour de Langkawi
2007 in road cycling
2007 in Malaysian sport